Choi Wan is a proposed MTR station on the proposed . It is proposed to be located at Choi Hing Road, Kwun Tong District, Kowloon, Hong Kong. The station is still under planning.

References

Kwun Tong District
Proposed railway stations in Hong Kong
MTR stations in Kowloon